Aughintober Pipe Band is a pipe band from Castlecaulfield in County Tyrone, Northern Ireland.

History
The band was originally a flute ensemble, but changed to a pipe band in 1949.

In 1997, the band registered with the Royal Scottish Pipe Band Association to enter competitions.

After the 2009 season, the band was upgraded from Grade 3A to Grade 2, having been upgraded from 3B to 3A in 2006.

The pipe major of the band is Gary Waterson, and the leading drummer Stephen Young.

References

External links 
 

Musical groups from County Tyrone
Grade 2 pipe bands
Musical groups established in 1949
1949 establishments in Northern Ireland